Rose in June was a galliot built in Denmark in 1808 and taken in prize in 1810 by the British. The French navy captured and burnt her in 1813 off the coast of West Africa.

On 17 June 1810 Rose in June, Longhurst, master, sailed from Portsmouth for Senegal in company with two other vessels.

Rose in June appears on a list of vessels that imported goods into the colony of Sierra Leone between May 1812 and June 1814.

The French frigates  and  captured and burnt Rose in June on 5 January 1813. She was on a voyage from Sierra Leone to Gorée.

Citations

References
 Thorpe, Robert (1815) A letter to William Wilberforce, Esq. M.P., vice president of the African Institution, &c. &c. &c. : containing remarks on the reports of the Sierra Leone Company, and the African Institution, with hints respecting the means by which an universal abolition of the slave trade might be carried into effect. Library of Congress: Miscellaneous Pamphlet Collection.

1808 ships
Ships built in Denmark
Captured ships
Age of Sail merchant ships of England
Maritime incidents in 1813